Xyanide is a shoot 'em up video game for the Xbox in 2006. It was developed by Playlogic Entertainment and published by Evolved Games, after being originally developed by Engine Software for the Game Boy Advance. It was also the final exclusive game released for the Xbox. An N-Gage version was planned but never released. A sequel titled Xyanide: Resurrection was released for the PC, PlayStation 2 and PlayStation Portable in 2007.

Gameplay

Plot
An intergalactic witch named Aguira has been captured and sentenced to death for her dreadful crimes, but a spaceship transporting Aguira to her execution was struck by an asteroid. To her surprise, the asteroid was rich in Xyanide, a mythical substance known for its abilities to make an exposed person's thoughts become reality. Taking advantage of the situation, the witch uses her new powers to create her own alternate universe as a tool to aid her escape and spread her destructive influence. It is up to the escort pilot Drake to try and stop the evil Aguira from accomplishing her goals and to carry out the sentence.

Reception

The game received above-average reviews according to the review aggregation website Metacritic.

Sequel

References

External links
 (Playlogic Entertainment)
 (Evolved Games)

2006 video games
Cancelled Game Boy Advance games
Cancelled N-Gage games
North America-exclusive video games
Science fantasy video games
Shoot 'em ups
Video games developed in the Netherlands
Video games about witchcraft
Xbox-only games
Xbox games
RenderWare games
Playlogic Entertainment games
Multiplayer and single-player video games
Evolved Games games